This table is a year-by-year list of end-of-season records for the Fukuoka SoftBank Hawks and its predecessor clubs.

External links 
 Fukuoka SoftBank Hawks Yearly results - NPB.jp